Muhammed Yetim (born 4 November 1994) is a Turkish archer competing in men's compound events. He won the silver medal in the men's team compound event at the 2019 World Archery Championships held in 's-Hertogenbosch, Netherlands.

In 2019, Yetim also won the silver medal in the men's individual compound event at the Summer Universiade held in Naples, Italy. Alongside Süleyman Araz, he also won the gold medal in the men's team compound event.

References

External links 
 

Living people
1994 births
Place of birth missing (living people)
Turkish male archers
World Archery Championships medalists
Universiade medalists in archery
Universiade gold medalists for Turkey
Universiade silver medalists for Turkey
Medalists at the 2019 Summer Universiade
21st-century Turkish people